Drury may refer to:

Places
 Drury, New Zealand, a town
 Drury, Flintshire, Wales, a village
 Drury, Kansas, United States, an unincorporated community
 Drury, a village in Florida, Massachusetts, United States
 Drury, Missouri, United States, an unincorporated community
 Drury Inlet, British Columbia, Canada
 Drury Rock, Antarctica

People
 Drury (surname)
 Drury A. Hinton (1839–1909), American lawyer, politician and Virginia Supreme Court of Appeals judge
 Drury Lacy Jr., third president of Davidson College (1855–1860)

Other uses
 Drury University, formerly Drury College, Springfield, Missouri
 Drury High School, North Adams, Massachusetts
 Drury Hotels operator of Drury Inns
 Drury Lane, a famous street in the Westend of London
 Drury Run, a river in Pennsylvania
 Drury convention, used in bridge
 HMS Drury (K316), a Captain-class frigate
 Newton B. Drury Scenic Parkway located in Redwood National and State Parks